Namhan River (Namhan-gang, South Han River) is a major river of South Korea, the 2nd-longest. It is a tributary of the Han River. It is famous for clean and clear water, especially in its upper reaches and tributaries, and serves as a source of water for Seoul. A popular bike path follows the river.  Several sections of it are used for public recreation, including rafting; some of these sections have their own traditional names, such as the "Dong-gang" or Dong River stretch, popular for natural beauty.

Some part of this river was found to be contaminated by bis-(2-ethylhexyl)-phthalate (DEHP) with 50 ppb.

Gallery

References

External Links 

Rivers of South Korea